Nathan Picchi is a New Zealand rugby league player who played professionally for the Leeds Rhinos.

Playing career
Picchi played for the Hawkes Bay Unicorns in the 1995 Lion Red Cup, and also represented the New Zealand Māori.

In 1996, he signed with the Leeds Rhinos. His career lasted just one match, suffering a bad shoulder dislocation fifty minutes into his début appearance. He was released at the end of the year.

In 1997, Picchi played for the Rochdale Hornets. He later played for Rotherham Giants, and the Gloucestershire Warriors.

In 1998, he played for Manawatu, and again represented New Zealand Māori.

References

1977 births
New Zealand rugby league players
New Zealand Māori rugby league players
New Zealand Māori rugby league team players
New Zealand expatriate sportspeople in England
Hawke's Bay rugby league team players
Leeds Rhinos players
Manawatu rugby league team players
Rochdale Hornets players
Rugby league locks
Living people